Qujiang New District is a district in Xi'an city, Shaanxi province, China.

History
The district was first created as a tourism district called Xi'an Qujiang Resort in 1993. The site originally had an area of 15.88 square kilometres. It has been expanded to 47 square kilometres. The resort became Qujiang New District ten years after its establishment. It is now an economic centre with arts, luxury shopping, tourism and 5-star hotels (e.g. Westin, W Hotels in Xi'an).

The district is home to a large number of tourism attractions and top businesses. It is also the most expensive area for residential properties in Xi'an.
Qujiang Ocean World
Qujiang International Conference & Exhibition Centre
Tang Paradise
Giant Wild Goose Pagoda

Geography
It is located in the south east part of Xi'an.

See also
Shaanxi

References

External links
Qujiang New District official government website 

Districts of Xi'an